The Sanjak of Preveza was a second-level Ottoman province (sanjak or liva) centred on the town of Preveze (Preveza) in southern Epirus, now part of Greece.

Preveza had been a Venetian possession until 1797, as part of the Venetian Ionian Islands, when it was occupied by the French. Ali Pasha of Ioannina conquered the town in 1798, and made it part of his de facto independent domain until his fall in 1822.

Preveza remained part of the sanjak of Ioannina thereafter. It appears for the first time in the salname (provincial year-book) of 1863 as a separate sanjak of the Ioannina Eyalet, although in the next year it is recorded as a province of Tirhala. By 1867, joined with the sanjak of Narda (Arta), the new Sanjak of Preveze became part of Ioannina Vilayet. The region of Arta was ceded to Greece in 1881, and the remaining province survived until conquered by the Greek Army during the First Balkan War of 1912–1913.

In 1912, it comprised two kazas (districts), those of Preveza itself and of Louros. The Greek army occupied the area during the First Balkan War, but the administration and local officials were kept in place for a time, until the creation of the Preveza Prefecture by Royal Decree of 3/16 March 1915. The kazas were termed "sub-governorates" (υποδιοικήσεις), under governmental commissioners (διοικητικοί επίτροποι) nominated by the Governor-General of Epirus in Ioannina. The kaza of Margariti was merged with the kaza of Preveza during that time.

References

Sources 
 
 

1863 establishments in the Ottoman Empire
1915 disestablishments in Greece
Janina vilayet
Preveza
Preveza
Preveza
States and territories established in 1863
States and territories disestablished in 1915